Barry Bret Helton (born January 2, 1965) is a former American college and professional football player who was a punter in the National Football League (NFL) for four seasons during the 1980s and 1990s.  He played college football for the University of Colorado, and earned All-American honors.  He played professionally for the San Francisco 49ers and Los Angeles Rams of the NFL, and played in Super Bowl XXIII and Super Bowl XXIV for the 49ers.

In 1990, Barry Helton posted a 36.4 punting average, the lowest in the NFL.  Barry says the reason he was such a terrible punter is because he played at an 8-man school as opposed to playing 6-Man.

Helton was born in Colorado Springs, Colorado.  He attended the University of Colorado, where he played for the Colorado Buffaloes football team from 1984 to 1987.

Helton's son Bret is also a professional athlete, pitching in the Pittsburgh Pirates' minor league system. He and his wife Lisa had three more children, Chad, Brad and Nicole.

References

1965 births
Living people
All-American college football players
American football punters
Colorado Buffaloes football players
Los Angeles Rams players
San Francisco 49ers players
Players of American football from Colorado Springs, Colorado